José Carrete de Julián (born 5 April 1951) is a Spanish former football manager and player who played as a defender in La Liga in the 1970s and 1980s.

Career
Carrete, began playing football with Caudal Deportivo. He played for Real Oviedo between 1971 and 1976. Carrete helped the club gain promotion from the Segunda División during the 1974–75 season, although following their subsequent relegation he was transferred to Valencia in 1976.

Valencia won the 1979 Copa del Rey, and Carrete was then a member of the successful Valencia side that won the 1980 European Cup Winners' Cup Final against Arsenal. His last games for Valencia were in the 1982–83 season.

Carrete made two appearances for the Spain national football team.

After he retired from playing football, Carrete became a coach. The highlight of his 20-year managerial career was being appointed manager of Segunda División's Real Oviedo after managing the club's affiliate, Real Oviedo Vetusta. Carrete also had a successful spell managing Cultural y Deportiva Leonesa for several seasons.

Personal
In 2015, Carrete suffered a stroke and was in a coma for days before recovering.

References

External links

1951 births
Living people
Footballers from Mieres, Asturias
Spanish footballers
Association football defenders
La Liga players
Real Oviedo players
Valencia CF players
Spanish football managers
Spain international footballers
Segunda División managers
Segunda División B managers
Tercera División managers
Real Oviedo Vetusta managers
Real Oviedo managers
Cultural Leonesa managers
CD Ourense managers
UP Langreo managers
SD Ponferradina managers
Gimnástica de Torrelavega managers
UD Vecindario managers